Krishna Babu or Krishnababu is one of the Indian names.

 G. Krishna Babu (born 1959), an eminent personality in Community Medicine in India 
 Krishna Babu (1999 film), a 1999 Telugu film